Willy (Willie) Schaller (February 23, 1933 – January 3, 2015) was a U.S. soccer defender who played most of his career in the German American Soccer League.  He also played on the U.S. soccer team at the 1952 Summer Olympics.  He was inducted into the National Soccer Hall of Fame in 1996.

Club career
While born in Germany, Schaller’s family moved to the United States when he was a young boy.  He joined Schwaben of the German American Soccer League when he was in high school.  In 1953, he joined the U.S. Army, serving until 1955.  At some point, he moved to Blau-Weiss Gottschee, playing with the team through at least 1960.

National teams
In 1952, he was selected to the U.S. soccer team which competed in the 1952 Summer Olympics.  He was nineteen at the time.  The U.S. lost its first game of the single elimination tournament to Italy.  In 1959, he was with the U.S. team which won the bronze medal at the Pan American Games.

Coaching
After retiring from playing professionally, Schaller became a youth and high school soccer coach.

References

External links
 National Soccer Hall of Fame profile

1933 births
2015 deaths
American soccer coaches
American soccer players
Association football defenders
Blau-Weiss Gottschee players
Chicago Schwaben players
Footballers at the 1952 Summer Olympics
Footballers at the 1959 Pan American Games
German emigrants to the United States
German-American Soccer League players
National Soccer Hall of Fame members
Olympic soccer players of the United States
Pan American Games bronze medalists for the United States
Pan American Games medalists in football
People from Esslingen (district)
Sportspeople from Stuttgart (region)
United States men's international soccer players
Medalists at the 1959 Pan American Games